Enginella leucozona is a species of sea snail, a marine gastropod mollusk in the family Pisaniidae.

References

 Coen G. (1933). Saggio di una Sylloge Molluscorum Adriaticorum. Memorie del Regio Comitato Talassografico Italiano 192: pp. i–vii, 1–186
 Gofas, S.; Le Renard, J.; Bouchet, P. (2001). Mollusca. in: Costello, M.J. et al. (eds), European Register of Marine Species: a check-list of the marine species in Europe and a bibliography of guides to their identification. Patrimoines Naturels. 50: 180–213

External links
 Philippi R.A. (1844). Nachtrag zum zweiten Bande der Enumeratio Molluscorum Siciliae. Zeitschrift für Malakozoologie 1: 100–112
  Cantraine, F. J. (1835). [Diagnoses ou descriptiones succinctes de quelques espèces nouvelles de mollusques]. Bulletin de l'Académie Royale des Sciences et Belles-lettres de Bruxelles. 2(11): 380–401
 Forbes E. (1844). Report on the Mollusca and Radiata of the Aegean sea, and on their distribution, considered as bearing on geology. Reports of the British Association for the Advancement of Science for 1843. 130–193
  Pallary, P. (1917). Mollusques marins des Dardanelles colligés par M. Claude Bravard. Journal de Conchyliologie. 63: 142–147

Pisaniidae
Gastropods described in 1843
Taxa named by Rodolfo Amando Philippi